Song Kwang-won (born Song Kwang-won on September 22, 1987) is a South Korean actor. Song began his career in musical theatre, notably in Ride Away (2008), The Front Line (2011), Black Mary Poppins (2012), and Blue Top returns (2012).

Life 
Song lived in Canada as a child, and is a permanent resident of the country. When his family returned to Korea, Song was enrolled in Kyewon Arts High School. The actor Joo Won is a friend of his from high school.

Filmography

Television series

Film

Theater

References

External links
 SY entertainment at SY entertainment 
 
 
 

21st-century South Korean male actors
South Korean male musical theatre actors
South Korean male stage actors
South Korean male television actors
South Korean male film actors
Living people
1987 births
People from Seoul